Rand is a town in the Riverina district of New South Wales, Australia. It is located in the Federation Council local government area.

It was formerly the terminus of the Rand railway line from Henty, which opened in 1920 and closed in 1975.

Rand Post Office opened on 1 January 1926.

References

External links

Rand Railway Station

Towns in the Riverina
Towns in New South Wales
Federation Council, New South Wales